Fool's errand is an English idiom referring to a foolish undertaking or a task certain to fail. It may also refer to:

Books
 A Fool's Errand, an 1879 novel by Albion W. Tourgée
 A Fool's Errand, a 1921 book by Jessie Louisa Rickard
 Fool's Errand (novel), a 2001 novel by Robin Hobb
 A Fool's Errand, a 2010 collection of poetry by Dermot Healy
 Fool's Errand, a 2017 book by Scott Horton

Films
 "A Fool's Errand", a 1927 silent short film from the Krazy Kat film series
 "A Fool's Errand", a 2003 episode of animated series Funky Cops

Other uses
 "Do You Really Love Me Too (Fool's Errand)", a 1963 British Top 20 single by Billy Fury
 The Fool's Errand, a 1987 computer game by Cliff Johnson
 A brand of snack cracker, popular in the 1980s
 "Fool's Errand", a song on the Fleet Foxes 2017 album, Crack-Up